Gorski Goren Trambesh is a village, located in Northern Bulgaria. The village is located in Gorna Oryahovitsa Municipality, Veliko Tarnovo Province. As of the 2020 census, the village has a population of 148 people.

Geography 
The village of Gorski Goren Trambesh is located at an elevation of 350 meters. The settlement is close near two hills, northern from the valley of Yantra River.

The distance between Gorski Goren Trambesh and Gorna Oryahovitsa is 25 km. It is located 30 km away from Veliko Tarnovo.

Culture 
Two kilometers away from the village there is an ancient area called Suludzhak, where traces of many civilizations such as the Roman Empire, Thracians and medieval Bulgarians have been found.

Buildings 

 The church “Sv. Ivan Rilski” was built in 1885, and was later renovated in 1987 after a massive earthquake.
 The Library and community center, was built in 1906 and is still active.

Ethnicity 
According to the Bulgarian population census in 2011.

References

Populated places in Veliko Tarnovo Province